XHTLN-FM (94.1 MHz) is a radio station that serves the Laredo, Texas, United States and Nuevo Laredo, Tamaulipas, Mexico border area. XHTLN is owned by Grupo Imagen and airs Imagen Radio programs.

History
XHTLN received its concession on November 29, 1988. It was owned by Víctor Manuel Moreno Torres. In 1998, Torres sold XHTLN to Radio Informativa, a subsidiary of Multimedios Radio. The station was further sold to Imagen in 2006.

References

External links 
Imagen Radio Laredo Facebook

Radio stations in Nuevo Laredo
Grupo Imagen